The Archiepiscopal Exarchate of Kharkiv was established on 2 April 2014 after division of the Ukrainian Catholic Archiepiscopal Exarchate of Donetsk – Kharkiv in two Exarchates .  The current, and first, Archiepiscopal Exarch is Bishop Vasyl Tuchapets, O.S.B.M. 

It is one of only five archiepiscopal exarchates worldwide - all of them being Ukrainian Rite.

In an interview with Aid to the Church in Need, Bishop Tuchapets described the social reality of his diocese in the following terms. “We started our work with our Greek Catholic Church faithful, made up mostly of former university students who remained in Kharkiv, and by former deportees to Siberia, but now most parishioners are locals who have found their faith through contact with our parishes. I think our task is to plough, to prepare the ground, after us come those who will sow, and the next generations will already reap."

Status as Archiepiscopal Exarchate

As Major Archbishops have similar authority to that of Patriarchs, Archiepiscopal Exarchates similarly have roughly the same status in canon law as Patriarchal Exarchates.

References

External links
 GCatholic.org information page about the Archiepiscopal Exarchate
Profile at catholic-hierarchy.org 

Ukrainian Greek Catholic Church
Kharkiv
Culture in Kharkiv